David Sibley may refer to:

 David Sibley (actor) (born 1948), British actor, active from 1976 to present
 David Sibley (music supervisor), American music supervisor, active from 1989 to present
 David Sibley (politician) (born 1948), Texas State Senator, 1991–2002
 David Allen Sibley (born 1961), American ornithologist